FK Rapid Bratislava was a Slovak association football club. The club was based in a quiet part of Ružinov, Bratislava. Founded was in 1931 as ŠK Prievoz.

Although not very successful in the recent years, it was a club with decent history. Its greatest success were two seasons (2003/2004 and 2004/2005) spent in the Slovak Second Division.

In 2005, the club was dissolved due to merging with Artmedia Bratislava.

References 

Rapid Bratislava
Rapid Bratislava
Rapid Bratislava